The V World Rhythmic Gymnastics Championships were held in Havana, Cuba on 10-11 November, 1971.

Competitors
There were competitors from 15 countries - Bulgaria, Soviet Union, Cuba, Hungary, Czechoslovakia, North Korea, Romania, Japan, New Zealand, Denmark, West Germany, Canada, Mexico, Sweden & Italy.

Medal table

Individuals

Ribbon

Rope

Ball

Hoop

All-Around

^ did not start

Groups

References 

Rhythmic Gymnastics World Championships
Rhythmic Gymnastics Championships
1971 in gymnastics
1971 in Cuban sport
November 1971 sports events in North America
Gymnastics competitions in Cuba